The Hot 100 Airplay chart ranks the most frequently played songs on United States radio stations, published by Billboard magazine. The chart was introduced in the magazine's issue dated October 20, 1984. During the 1980s, 132 songs topped the chart.

Number-one airplay hits

See also
1980s in music

Sources
Whitburn, Joel. The Billboard Book of Top 40 Hits. (2004) 

Billboard charts
Lists of number-one songs in the United States
United States Hot 100 Airplay
1980s in American music